Joseph Diandy (born 20 March 1950) is a Senegalese basketball player. He competed in the men's tournament at the 1972 Summer Olympics.

References

1950 births
Living people
Senegalese men's basketball players
Olympic basketball players of Senegal
Basketball players at the 1972 Summer Olympics
Place of birth missing (living people)